Healthcare in Slovakia has features of the Bismarck, the Beveridge and the National Health Insurance systems.  Compulsory healthcare contributions, which are income-related, are paid to the chosen health insurance company. 4% is paid by the employee and 10% by the employer. Self-employed people have to pay all 14%. The government pays in respect of those not working, at a rate of 4.9% of average income. More than 98% of the population is covered by health insurance. There are three health insurance companies, one owned by the government which insures 65% of the population.  Entitlement to treatment is not affected by the level of contributions. The system does not cover plastic surgery or all dental treatment. What is covered by health insurance is specified in legislation. The full cost of medication is not always covered.

Medical procedures are assigned an artificial value in ‘points’ which is converted to real monetary value by the health insurance company. General practitioners get a capitation payment for each registered patient.  There are reimbursement limits, and these can be exceeded in respect of individual patients by negotiation.

Public healthcare expenditure was about €3400 million in 2009, around 5.36% of the gross domestic product.

Slovaks rarely use private healthcare, but a health tourism industry is developing around the country's natural spas.

There are 44 state hospitals.

An eHealth system, administered by the National Healthcare Information Centre was launched in 2018. 92 hospitals were connected to the system. All outpatients’ departments are required to participate.  Online medical records are now linked to ID cards. Medication can be prescribed on line and pharmacies can also access the records.

See also
Health in Slovakia
List of hospitals in Slovakia

References